Stéphane Hernandez (born 24 August 1979) is a French football manager and former player who played as a defender. As of 2021, he is the head coach of AS Savigneux-Montbrison.

Personal life
Born in France, Hernandez is of Spanish descent.

Notes

1979 births
Living people
People from Échirolles
French footballers
French people of Spanish descent
Ligue 1 players
Ligue 2 players
AS Saint-Étienne players
Amiens SC players
Vannes OC players
FC Aurillac Arpajon Cantal Auvergne players
Association football defenders
Sportspeople from Isère
Chambéry SF players

French football managers
Footballers from Auvergne-Rhône-Alpes